Trip to Moscow is an album by trumpeter Valery Ponomarev which was recorded in 1988 and released on the Reservoir label.

Reception 

In his review on AllMusic, Scott Yanow called it an "excellent outing" stating: "For his second Reservoir set, trumpeter Valery Ponomarev performs six of his originals, which are dedicated to different aspects of the Russian homeland from where he had emigrated 15 years earlier ... the music is mostly strictly hard bop, quite accessible and hard-swinging".

Track listing 
All compositions by Valery Ponomarev except where noted
 "Same Place, Same Time" – 8:03
 "Gettin' to Bolshoi" – 7:42
 "Gorky Park" – 8:06
 "Trip to Moscow" – 9:16
 "For You Only" – 7:59
 "The Best Thing for You" (Irving Berlin) – 4:36
 "Tell Me When/Skazshi Kagda" – 8:59

Personnel 
Valery Ponomarev – trumpet
Ralph Moore – tenor saxophone
Larry Willis – piano
Dennis Irwin – bass 
 Victor Jones – drums

References 

Valery Ponomarev albums
1988 albums
Reservoir Records albums
Albums recorded at Van Gelder Studio